Trumann is a city in Poinsett County, Arkansas, United States. The population was 7,399 at the 2020 census. It is included in the Jonesboro Metropolitan Statistical Area.

Geography
Trumann is located in the Arkansas Delta at  (35.676313, -90.519183).

Ecologically, Trumann is located within the St. Francis Lowlands ecoregion within the larger Mississippi Alluvial Plain. The St. Francis Lowlands are a flat region with fertile soil mostly covered with row crop agriculture today, though also containing sand blows and sunken lands remaining from the 1811–12 New Madrid earthquakes. Waterways have mostly been channelized, causing loss of aquatic and riparian wildlife habitat. The St. Francis Sunken Lands Wildlife Management Area, which preserves some of the bottomland hardwood forest typical of this ecoregion prior to development for row agriculture lies east of Trumann along the St. Francis River.

Interstate 555 runs through Trumann. U.S. Route 63 ran through Trumann prior to October 2021 before being rerouted.

Demographics

2020 census

As of the 2020 United States census, there were 7,399 people, 2,782 households, and 1,952 families residing in the city.

2010 census
As of the census of 2010, there were 7,243 people, 2,616 households, and 1,890 families residing in the city. The racial makeup of the city was 94.30% White, 4.04% Black or African American, 0.28% Native American, 0.20% Asian, 0.01% Pacific Islander, 0.45% from other races, and 0.73% from two or more races. 0.81% of the population were Hispanic or Latino of any race.

There were 2,734 households, out of which 32.8% had children under the age of 18 living with them, 50.7% were married couples living together, 15.5% had a female householder with no husband present, and 30.0% were non-families. 26.6% of all households were made up of individuals, and 12.8% had someone living alone who was 65 years of age or older. The average household size was 2.49 and the average family size was 3.00.

In the city, the population was spread out, with 26.8% under the age of 18, 8.8% from 18 to 24, 26.9% from 25 to 44, 22.3% from 45 to 64, and 15.1% who were 65 years of age or older. The median age was 36 years. For every 100 females, there were 90.2 males. For every 100 females age 18 and over, there were 84.1 males.

The median income for a household in the city was $26,533, and the median income for a family was $32,297. Males had a median income of $26,196 versus $18,828 for females. The per capita income for the city was $12,419. About 17.4% of families and 21.2% of the population were below the poverty line, including 28.5% of those under age 18 and 19.4% of those age 65 or over.

History
On June 5, 2014 a derecho passed the through the town, causing extensive damage to trees and power lines. The estimated wind gust at the time of the storm was between 80 and 85 mph, with sustained winds of 75 mph.

On December 10, 2021, a tornado came through the town causing damage. It was part of a tornado outbreak that spawned multiple tornados in Missouri, Kentucky, Tennessee and Illinois that same evening.

Business and economy
The agriculture and service industries make up a large share of employment in Trumann.

In 1980, the Baldwin Piano Company opened a piano manufacturing facility in Trumann. Gibson Guitar Corporation acquired the plant in 2001, and by 2006 Gibson laid off workers as they moved piano production to China.  It is now completely vacant.

In 2005, the Parker Hannifin Company closed their facility which served automotive industry after more 20 years working in this City. The production lines and processes were relocated to other Parker Hannifin site located in Apodaca Nuevo León Mexico.

The Maxie Theatre was a historic movie theatre at 136 Arkansas Highway 463 South in Trumann, Arkansas.

Government
Trumann uses a city council with ten council members. As of November 2022, the current mayor of Trumann is Jay Paul Woods.

Education 
Public education of elementary and secondary school students is primarily provided by the Trumann School District, which leads to graduation from Trumann High School.

Notable people
 Carl E. Bailey, governor of Arkansas from 1937 to 1941,
Elbert Shelley, NFL Football player for the Atlanta Falcons 1987 to 1996
Joe Hollimon, CFL Football player for the Edmonton Eskimos 1976-1985, six Grey Cup championships

Gallery

List of highways 
 Interstate 555

References

Cities in Poinsett County, Arkansas
Cities in Arkansas
Jonesboro metropolitan area